Bryan Hurlburt (born June 9, 1979) is an American politician who has served as the Connecticut Commissioner of Agriculture since 2019. He previously served in the Connecticut House of Representatives from the 53rd district from 2007 to 2013.

References

1979 births
Living people
Democratic Party members of the Connecticut House of Representatives